Jesse Bollard Hide (13 March 1857 — 19 March 1924) was an English cricketer who played for Sussex between 1876 and 1893 and for South Australia from 1880 to 1883.

Hide was born in Eastbourne, Sussex. A right-handed batsman, accurate fast-medium bowler and good fieldsman, he made his first-class debut for Sussex in 1876 against Gloucestershire. 

In 1878, on the recommendation of James Lillywhite, who had captained England on their tour of Australia in 1876-77, Hide was appointed coach of the South Australian Cricket Association, and spent five seasons in Adelaide, playing in all of South Australia's important matches. In his history of Australian cricket Johnny Moyes credits Hide with a leading part in the early development of South Australian cricket: "He arrived in 1878, stayed for three [sic] years at a salary of £200 a year, and laid the foundation on which the future glories of the State's cricket were built." Hide also laid the pitch at the Adelaide Oval, discovering and bringing in the soil that made the pitch "equal to the best provided in any part of the world".

Hide returned to England in 1883 and carried on playing for Sussex until 1893. He made over 4,400 runs and took over 400 wickets for Sussex. He played for a number of other teams including England XI, England, The Rest, the South, Players, Players of the South, Lord Sheffield's XI and Lord March's XI. Playing for Sussex against MCC at Lord's in May 1890 he took four wickets in four deliveries. He was for some time employed by Lord Sheffield.

Hide died in Edinburgh at the age of 67.

References

External links
 
 Jesse Hide at CricketArchive

1857 births
1924 deaths
English cricketers
English cricket coaches
Sussex cricketers
South Australia cricketers
Players cricketers
North v South cricketers
Cornwall cricketers
Players of the South cricketers
Lord March's XI cricketers
Non-international England cricketers